Udea nigrescens is a moth of the family Crambidae. It is endemic to the Hawaiian islands of Kauai, Oahu, Molokai and Maui.

The larvae feed on Abutilon species, Sida cordifolia and Sida rhombifolia.

External links

Moths described in 1881
Endemic moths of Hawaii
nigrescens